Paul Pedersen or Petersen may refer to:

Paul Pedersen (composer) (born 1935), Canadian composer
Paul Pedersen (gymnast) (1886–1948), Norwegian gymnast

See also
Paul Petersen (born 1945), American actor
Paul Peterson (disambiguation)